The xylorimba (sometimes referred to as xylo-marimba or marimba-xylophone) is a pitched percussion instrument similar to an extended-range xylophone with a range identical to some 5-octave celestas or 5-octave marimbas, though typically an octave higher than the latter. Despite its name, it is not a combination of a xylophone and a marimba; its name has been a source of confusion, as many composers have called for a 'xylorimba', including Alban Berg, Pierre Boulez and Olivier Messiaen, but for parts requiring only a four-octave xylophone.

Like the xylophone and marimba, the xylorimba consists of a series of wooden bars laid out like a piano keyboard "with a compass sufficiently large to embrace the low-sounding bars of the marimba and the highest-sounding bars of the xylophone." The lower notes of the xylorimba are described as sounding closer to a xylophone than a marimba, on account of its bars being both thicker and narrower, and due to the different size and shape of its resonators; the size and shape of the bars differs to emphasize different overtones.

The xylorimba experienced its greatest popularity in the 1920s and 30s, particularly within vaudeville theatre.

Compositions including xylorimba
(4, 4.5, and 5-octave instruments):
Alban Berg: Three Pieces for Orchestra (1914–15, revised 1929)
Erik Bergman: Hathor Suite for soprano, baritone, mixed chorus and ensemble (cor anglais, flute, harp and percussion) (1971)
William Bolcom: Dream Music No. 2 for four players (1982)
Pierre Boulez:  for alto and six instruments (1953–55, revised 1957)
Pierre Boulez:  for soprano and orchestra (1957–62)
HK Gruber: Piano Concerto (2016; world premiere)
Helmut Lachenmann) for three ad hoc players and 14 players (1982/84)
Helmut Lachenmann: Souvenir for 41 instruments (1959)
Helmut Lachenmann: Accanto for solo clarinet and orchestra (1975–76)
Olivier Messiaen:  for piano and chamber orchestra (1963)
Olivier Messiaen:  for mixed choir, seven solo instruments and large orchestra (1965–69)
Olivier Messiaen:  for piano solo, horn, xylorimba, glockenspiel and orchestra (1971–74)
Olivier Messiaen:  opera (1975–83)
Olivier Messiaen:  for large orchestra (1988–92)
Krzysztof Penderecki: Strophen for soprano, voce recitante, and 10 instruments (1959)
Igor Stravinsky: The Flood: A musical play TV opera (1962)
Karlheinz Stockhausen:  for three orchestras (1955–57) (in the list of instruments for Orchestra III, but the score itself calls for a marimbaphone, as in Orchestra I)
Iannis Xenakis:  for percussion sextet (1978)

References
 

Keyboard percussion instruments
Stick percussion idiophones